Abū Maymūn Jābān al-Kurdī, also referred to as Jaban Sahabi, was a companion of the Islamic prophet Muhammad.

The early Islamic scholar Abu Nu'aym al-Isfahani mentions Jaban in Ma`rifat al-Sahâba wa Fadâ'ilihim. Jaban's status as a companion is also mentioned twice in Ibn al-Athir's book Usd al-ghabah fi marifat al-Saḥabah. He was also known to have narrated 10 prophetic ahadith according to Ibn Hajar al-Asqalani in the book Al-Isabah fi tamyiz al Sahabah. The book Takmilah al-Ikmal by Ibn Nuqtah also mentions him.

See also
List of non-Arab Sahabah

References

Sahabah hadith narrators